Shawbury is a civil parish in Shropshire, England.  It contains 30 listed buildings that are recorded in the National Heritage List for England.  Of these, one is listed at Grade I, the highest of the three grades, and the others are at Grade II, the lowest grade.  The parish contains the village of Shawbury and the surrounding countryside.  Most of the listed buildings are houses, cottages, farmhouses and farm buildings, the earliest of which are timber framed.  The other listed buildings include a church, structures in the churchyard, a public house, a summer house, a bridge, three mileposts, and a brick kiln.


Key

Buildings

References

Citations

Sources

Lists of buildings and structures in Shropshire